Gerhard Faulstich is a German baritone.

In 1981, he joined the Staatsoper Hannover and the faculty of the Musikhochschule Hannover where he is a professor. At the Staatsoper Hannover he performed among others Papageno in Mozart's Die Zauberflöte, Tsar Peter in Lortzing's Zar und Zimmermann, Wolfram in Tannhäuser, and the title role in Wolfgang Rihm's Jakob Lenz. In 1982, he sang Bach's St Matthew Passion, conducted by Erhard Egidi at the Neustädter Kirche, performing the words of Jesus with Lutz Michael Harder as the Evangelist. The same year he recorded the work, conducted by Michel Corboz, alongside Kurt Equiluz as the Evangelist. Reviewer Alan Blyth said that Faulstich "takes an unpretentious, conversational approach to the part of Jesus; he is direct and business-like". In 1989, he performed in Enrico Leone, an opera by Agostino Steffani that had opened the opera house in Hannover in 1689, celebrating 300 years. Faulstich is also noted for his portrayal of Alfonso in Mozart's Così fan tutte, appearing at La Scala of Milan in 1991 and at the Internationale Maifestspiele Wiesbaden in 1993.

Faulstich recorded Bach's Missae (Kyrie and Gloria) with Helmuth Rilling and the Gächinger Kantorei, and cantatas with Diethard Hellmann and Martin Reimann. In 1979, he recorded Schuberts masses No 1, No. 1, No. 2, No. 3, No. 4 and No. 5 with the Spandauer Kantorei, conducted by Martin Behrmann.

Faulstich wrote a book on teaching voice, "" (1997)

References

External links 

 

German operatic baritones
Living people
20th-century births
Date of birth missing (living people)
Year of birth missing (living people)